House is a village in Quay County, New Mexico, United States. The population was 68 at the 2010 census.

Geography
House is located at  (34.648034, -103.903803).

House is surrounded mostly by ranch and farm land.

Infrastructure
The village includes a co-operative store and gas station, a community center, and a highschool.  The logo for the highschool team is a Cowboy.

Demographics

As of the census of 2000, there were 72 people, 34 households, and 21 families residing in the village. The population density was 78.3 people per square mile (30.2/km2). There were 52 housing units at an average density of 56.5 per square mile (21.8/km2). The racial makeup of the village was 94.44% White, 2.78% from other races, and 2.78% from two or more races. Hispanic or Latino of any race were 6.94% of the population.

There were 34 households, out of which 20.6% had children under the age of 18 living with them, 47.1% were married couples living together, 8.8% had a female householder with no husband present, and 35.3% were non-families. 35.3% of all households were made up of individuals, and 20.6% had someone living alone who was 65 years of age or older. The average household size was 2.12 and the average family size was 2.68.

In the village, the population was spread out, with 20.8% under the age of 18, 2.8% from 18 to 24, 19.4% from 25 to 44, 23.6% from 45 to 64, and 33.3% who were 65 years of age or older. The median age was 52 years. For every 100 females, there were 111.8 males. For every 100 females age 18 and over, there were 111.1 males.

The median income for a household in the village was $25,625, and the median income for a family was $35,000. Males had a median income of $21,250 versus $32,500 for females. The per capita income for the village was $24,300. There were 5.0% of families and 14.3% of the population living below the poverty line, including no under eighteens and none of those over 64.

References

Villages in Quay County, New Mexico
Villages in New Mexico